Corne Powell (born 27 May 1974 in Namibia) was a Namibian rugby union player. His playing position was centre. He was named in the Namibia squad for both the 2003 Rugby World Cup and the 2007 Rugby World Cup's, making 5 total appearances in the tournaments, scoring one try. He was the Namibian captain heading into the 2003 World Cup, before coach David Waterston announced Sean Furter as captain for the tournament.

References

External links
itsrugby.co.uk profile

1974 births
Living people
Namibia international rugby union players
Namibian rugby union players
Rugby union centres
Rugby union players from Windhoek